Binnaguri Junction railway station is the railway station which serves the town of Binnaguri near Birpara which is a part of Doars region in the Indian state of West Bengal. It lies in the New Jalpaiguri–Alipurduar–Samuktala Road line of Northeast Frontier Railway zone, Alipurduar railway division.

Trains
Major trains running from Binnaguri Junction are as follows:
Dr. Ambedkar Nagar–Kamakhya Express
Kamakhya–Anand Vihar Express
Delhi-Alipurduar Mahananda Express
Alipurduar - Secunderabad Express
Sealdah-Alipurduar Kanchan Kanya Express
Kamakhya-Patna Capital Express
Ranchi–Kamakhya Express
Siliguri–Alipurduar Intercity Express
Siliguri Bamanhat Intercity Express.

References 

Railway junction stations in West Bengal
Alipurduar railway division